Maqsad is a 1984 Indian Hindi-language action film, produced by D. Rama Naidu under the Suresh Productions banner and directed by K. Bapaiah. The film stars Jeetendra, Rajesh Khanna,Jaya Prada and Sridevi with music composed by Bappi Lahiri. Shatrughan Sinha, Waheeda Rehman, Prem Chopra, Ranjeet, Shakti Kapoor, Kader Khan, Amjad Khan, Shreeram Lagoo are featured in supporting roles.

In the film, Rajeshwar is the only son of a wealthy industrialist, while Tilak hails from a poor family. When Rajeshwar's father is murdered and the blame falls on Tilak, he must strive to prove his innocence. The film is a remake of the Telugu film Mundadugu (1983). The film was a major commercial success upon its release, grossing ₹4.25 crore at the box office, becoming the second highest grossing Indian film of 1984.

Plot
Rajeshwar is the only son of Dharamraj, who is an industrialist, and partners with Naglingam Reddy, Nagendra, and Dhanraj. Rajeshwar then meets a girl from a poor family, Bharati, who happens to be his school teacher's daughter and falls in love with her. Bharati's father is Vishnupratap, a schoolteacher, who is unhappy, for he is unable to earn enough money to feed his family and provide them with basic amenities. He and other teachers work in the school managed by Dharamraj. The fund management headed by Dhanraj has been for years without giving any hike in fees to teachers making them work. When Rajeshwar learns of this, he confronts the partners for their lies. Bharati has a neighbor, Tilak, who is unemployed, and lives with his mother, Sharda, who works as a maidservant in Dhanraj's house. Later he is hired as a manager in Dharamraj industries and obstructs the three partners' criminal activities. Rajeshwar is impressed by Tilak's sincerity. Meanwhile, Tilak falls in love with the Dhanraj's daughter, Rani. Dharamraj accidentally meets Sharda and realizes that Tilak is his long-lost nephew. Dharamraj tells Rajeshwar the history of his family and how Tilak is related to him. Then Dharamraj is killed, and the evidence points towards Tilak and he has to gather evidence to prove his innocence.

Cast
Jeetendra as Tilak
Rajesh Khanna as Rajeshwar
Jaya Prada as Rani
Sridevi as Bharati
Waheeda Rehman as Sharda
Prem Chopra as Dhanraj
Ranjeet as Naagendra
Shakti Kapoor as Naagpal
Kader Khan as Naaglingam
Amjad Khan as Bicchu Reddy
Om Shivpuri as Dharamraj
Shreeram Lagoo as Master Vishnu Pratap
Asrani as Bhagwandas
Iftekhar as Doctor
Shatrughan Sinha as Satyajeet (special appearance)

Soundtrack 
Lyrics: Indeevar

Trivia:-
Ao Jao Nagraja Tum Ao Jao played back by Kishore Kumar was picturised on Sridevi, Jaya Prada, Rajesh Khanna and Jeetendra as a duet song. Some of the lines sang by Kishore Kumar was recorded twice and mixed together to cater for the heroes to sing together. This is a first song that Kishore Kumar made a duet with himself created by Bappi Lahiri.

Reception
Maqsad grossed ₹4.25 crore at the box office, becoming the second highest-grossing film of 1984.

Trivia 
Jeetendra's two films, Maqsad and Akalmand released on same date.

References

External links

1984 films
Indian buddy films
1980s Hindi-language films
Hindi remakes of Telugu films
Films directed by K. Bapayya
Films scored by Bappi Lahiri
Suresh Productions films